Christopher Bob Shelton (born June 26, 1980) is an American former professional baseball first baseman. He played in Major League Baseball (MLB) for the Detroit Tigers, Texas Rangers, and Seattle Mariners over his 5-year major league career.  Shelton is a cousin of former NFL quarterback Alex Smith.

Amateur career
Before entering professional baseball, he played at Cottonwood High School, Salt Lake Community College, and the University of Utah.  While playing with Utah, Shelton was named to the Mountain West Conference All-Tournament Team as a junior.

Professional career

Detroit Tigers
Shelton was drafted by the Pittsburgh Pirates in the 33rd round, although he never made the team's 40-man roster. Unprotected, he was selected by the Detroit Tigers in the Rule 5 draft. In 2004, he played sparingly because the Tigers had to keep him on their roster because of the Rule 5 rules.  He only batted 57 times.

While in Detroit, due to his red hair and prodigious batting, he had earned various nicknames, such as "Red Pop" (a reference to the Detroit-made Faygo beverage) from the Tiger faithful. Tigers play-by-play commentators Rod Allen and Mario Impemba often called him "Big Red" or "Orange Crush."

On April 15, 2004, Shelton made his major league debut with the Detroit Tigers as a pinch hitter against the Toronto Blue Jays. He went hitless in two at-bats as Roy Halladay pitched a complete game shutout against the Tigers.

In , Shelton hit nine home runs in the first 13 games of the season; this made him the fastest player in American League history to reach that mark at that point in a season. He earned the American League Player of the Week accolade for April 3, 2006. Shelton's power dropped significantly after April, however, and on July 31, 2006, he was optioned to Triple-A Toledo to make room for Sean Casey, whom the Tigers had acquired from Pittsburgh in a trade-deadline deal. On September 1, Shelton was recalled back to Detroit as an emergency catcher for Iván Rodríguez.

During  spring training, Shelton started and finished spring training with the Tigers and by the end of spring training there was one spot left on the team's roster and the fight was between Marcus Thames and Chris Shelton. Shelton did not make the roster, which left him heading to Toledo for the 2007 season.

Texas Rangers
On December 5, 2007, Shelton was traded to the Texas Rangers for Freddy Guzmán, and on January 14, designated for assignment in order to make room for Kazuo Fukumori, a veteran reliever from the Japanese leagues. His contract was then purchased on April 29, 2008, from the Triple-A Oklahoma RedHawks, again by the Texas Rangers, when Jason Botts was designated for assignment. On June 26, 2008, the strikeout prone Shelton was designated for assignment to make way for Chris Davis. He cleared waivers, and was reassigned once more to the RedHawks. Shelton became a free agent at the end of the season.

Seattle Mariners
On December 8, 2008, Shelton signed a minor league contract with the Seattle Mariners. He batted .460 during 2009 spring training (.534 OBP, .720 SLG), second on the team among players with at least 30 at-bats, but did not break camp with the major-league club. On July 10, 2009, the Seattle Mariners called up Shelton to add more pop on the bench and he came through with the game-winning run on July 12 delivering the winning run in a Seattle Mariners win. Shelton was designated for assignment by the Mariners on August 1, 2009. His contract was then purchased on August 5, 2009, from the Triple-A Tacoma Rainiers.

He was granted free agency on October 15, .

Houston Astros
Shelton signed a minor league contract on December 8, 2009 with Houston Astros

New York Mets
Shelton became a free agent after the 2010 season. On February 20, 2011, he signed a minor league contract with the New York Mets for the 2011 season.

Shelton was released before the season began at Triple A for the New York Mets minor league team.

References

External links

1980 births
Living people
Detroit Tigers players
Texas Rangers players
Seattle Mariners players
Baseball players from Salt Lake City
Major League Baseball first basemen
Salt Lake Bruins baseball players
Utah Utes baseball players
Williamsport Crosscutters players
Hickory Crawdads players
Lynchburg Hillcats players
Altoona Curve players
Toledo Mud Hens players
Oklahoma RedHawks players
Tacoma Rainiers players
Round Rock Express players
Gulf Coast Astros players
Cottonwood High School (Murray, Utah) alumni